Pure Energy: the very best of Information Society is a compilation album by the synthpop band Information Society. It is generally poorly regarded by band members.

Track listing
 "What's on Your Mind (Pure Energy)" - 4:18
 "Peace & Love, Inc. (Biokraft Mix)" - 5:02
 "Empty 3.0" - 8:34
 "Closing In 2.0" - 8:13
 "On The Outside 2.1" - 6:49
 "Walking Away (Leæther Strip Mix)" - 5:01
 "What's on Your Mind (Pure Energy) (Effcee Mix)" - 5:42
 "Are 'Friends' Electric? (Slightly Altered Version)" - 4:57
 "Going, Going, Gone (Razed in Black Mix)" - 4:58
 "Express Yourself" - 5:01
 "Ozar Midrashim 1.1" - 6:54
 "Seek 300 2.11" - 4:36
 "The Ridge 1.1" - 9:41

Production
This album contains tracks from the albums Don't Be Afraid (done by Kurt Harland alone) and InSoc Recombinant (a remix album, again a solo work by Harland), along with different mixes of "Are Friends Electric?" and "What's On Your Mind", and a cover version of a Madonna song (which had been made for Cleopatra's tribute album entitled "Virgin Voices Vol. 1: A Tribute To Madonna").

The album was produced by Cleopatra Records from archived material without any involvement from the band. Despite being listed in the liner notes as the album's producer, singer Harland did not work on it, and did not know of it before it was released.

The band's reactions
Paul Robb says this is "not an Information Society record" and "an insult to both the band and the fans". He also detested the cover art, calling it "dreadful". 

Despite refusing to "endorse or un-endorse" it, Harland expressed a strong dislike regarding the cover art, for being poorly done and for depicting him bearing a firearm.

The band has referred to it in their MySpace blog as "that horrible Cleopatra abomination".

External links
 Track-by-track review

Information Society (band) albums
2004 compilation albums